Der Bärenhäuter (German "Bearskin man") may refer to:

Der Bärenhäuter (fairy tale), Bearskin, by the Brothers Grimm
Der Bärenhäuter (opera), by Siegfried Wagner 1899
Der Bärenhäuter, opera by Arnold Mendelssohn
Der Bärenhäuter (film)